Torquil Campbell (born 17 March 1972) is the co-lead singer and a songwriter for the Montreal-based indie rock band Stars. In addition to singing, he also plays the melodica, trumpet, synthesizer, and tambourine. Campbell is also an actor and playwright, most recently co-creating and starring in the play True Crime, produced by Crow's Theatre in Toronto.

He is a co-host of Soft Revolution, a podcast about the intersection of art, culture, and politics, along with Toronto-based actor Ali Momen. Previously, Campbell was the co-host of The Basement Revue Podcast, along with musician Jason Collett and poet Damian Rogers, as well as a regular contributor to the CBC radio program Q.

Music career
Campbell is the cofounder of the indie rock band Stars, formed in 2000. He is involved in a solo project called Dead Child Star, created in March 2008. The first album from Dead Child Star came out in January 2011 and was titled Cold Hands, Warm Heart. He is also a member of the band Memphis. They have released four albums to date: I Dreamed We Fell Apart (2004), A Little Place in the Wilderness (2006), Here Comes a City (2011), and most recently, Leave with Me (2019). This album was funded through a crowdfunding campaign. In addition to his involvement in these projects, Campbell occasionally records and performs with Broken Social Scene, a Canadian indie rock band and musical collective.

Theatre career
Campbell has worked as an actor for much of his life, appearing onstage throughout North America, playing roles as diverse as Gary, the teenage prostitute, in the original New York production of the controversial play Shopping and Fucking, starring Philip Seymour Hoffman, and the title role in Shakespeare's Henry V.

He has directed theatre, including a production of Romeo and Juliet for the Hamptons Shakespeare Festival. Campbell has also had numerous acting roles in Canadian television series and TV movies, including the role of Bill Badger in the animated series Rupert, the television films Heaven on Earth and Pray for Me, Paul Henderson, and guest appearances in Sex and the City and Law & Order. He has also appeared in several feature films. Additionally, Campbell has designed music and sound for theatre.

Campbell toured a play across Canada co-created with Chris Abraham about convicted murderer and imposter Christian Gerhartsreiter. Entitled True Crime, the play has been performed in various large and small venues across the nation.

Personal life
Campbell was born in Sheffield, England, and came to Canada during childhood with his family. He is the son of actor Douglas Campbell and his wife, Moira Wylie. He attended and graduated from Jarvis Collegiate Institute in Toronto before going on to study theatre in New York City. Campbell and his family reside in Vancouver.

References

External links

 
 Bandcamp profile

1972 births
Living people
Anglo-Scots
English emigrants to Canada
Canadian songwriters
Canadian pop singers
Canadian male stage actors
Canadian male television actors
Male actors from Toronto
Musicians from Toronto
Canadian indie rock musicians
Stars (Canadian band) members
Broken Social Scene members
21st-century Canadian male singers